Carl Edward Asaba (born 28 January 1973) is an English former footballer who played as a forward in the Football League. He began his career with non-league Dulwich Hamlet, his goalscoring prowess earning him a move to Brentford in 1994. He played for Colchester United on loan, before moving to Reading in 1997. He had successful stints with Gillingham, where he scored 36 goals in 77 league appearances, and Sheffield United, scoring 23 times in 67 league games. He also played for Stoke City and ended his career with Millwall. Returned to involvement in the world of professional football in 2021 via co-commentary for BBC Radio Sheffield and expert analysis for Sheffield United TV live. Appointed ambassador for the Sheffield children's hospital charity in 2020 and has organised charity events via Sarbs Charity Events with events giving people a chance to ‘beat-a-Blade’ (himself and former players) in sporting activities with all proceeds going directly to the Children's Hospital Charity.

Career

Born in Westminster, London, Asaba started his career with Dulwich Hamlet. He earned a moved to Brentford in 1994 having scored a number of goals at non-league level. He made little impact in his debut season, however in his first full season his form improved considerably, developing pace and strength on the ball. Asaba made 12 league appearances and scored two goals for Colchester United on loan in 1995. He made his professional debut at Colchester, where he scored on his debut against Barnet. He returned to Brentford, scoring 23 goals in the 1996–97 season as the Bees lost out in the play-offs. Asaba's goalscoring exploits then saw him earn an £800,000 move to Reading in 1997.

After failing to make an impact at Reading, scoring just eight goals in 32 league appearances, Asaba was signed to Gillingham for a club record fee of £590,000. He soon formed a formidable partnership with Robert Taylor and finished the 1998–99 season as the club's top scorer, scoring 23 goals in all competitions. He scored in the season's play-off final against Manchester City, opening the scoring 1–0 to Gillingham in the 81st minute. Strike partner Taylor scored the second in the 86th minute, but a last minute comeback from City took the tie to extra time and then on to penalties, which City won 3–1. In a spell that was dogged by injury, Asaba scored 40 goals in 91 appearances in all competitions.

Asaba joined Sheffield United for a fee of £92,500 on 9 March 2001. He became a fan favourite after scoring the winner in a 2–1 win over bitter rivals Sheffield Wednesday in the Steel City derby on 1 April 2001. On 16 December 2002, Sheffield United reported Reading player John Mackie to The Football Association and Professional Footballers Association after racially abusing Asaba during a 2–0 win for United on 14 December 2002, prompting an apology from Mackie and two weeks' of his wages donated to the Kick Racism Out of Football campaign. Mackie was later handed a three-match ban and a £1,500 fine, with a five-match ban and another £1,500 suspended until the end of the following season.

On 6 August 2003, Asaba signed for Stoke City on a free transfer, and made his debut three days later in a 3–0 win over Derby County. His time with Stoke was largely unsuccessful, scoring only nine league goals in 70 appearances. With 12 months remaining on his Stoke contract, Asaba handed-in a transfer request in May 2005.

Millwall moved to sign Asaba on 25 August 2005 on a free transfer. He played in 24 games and scored four goals for Millwall before being one of eight players released from the club at the end of the 2005–06 season.

After leaving Millwall, Asaba began training with Leicester City on non-contract terms in October 2006. However, he failed to agree a permanent deal with the club, and also failed to agree to terms with Nottingham Forest and Yeovil Town. In November 2006, he was given a trial at Chesterfield, where he also failed to sign permanently.

Personal life 
After retiring from football, Asaba settled in Sheffield and entered the motor trade. During the 2021–22 season, he worked as a co-commentator for BBC Radio Sheffield and Sheffield United's in-house television channel.

Career statistics

A.  The "Other" column constitutes appearances and goals (including those as a substitute) in the Football League play-offs and Football League Trophy.

Honours

Club
Brentford
1996–97 Football League Second Division play-off runner-up (level 3)

Gillingham
1998–99 Football League Second Division play-off runner-up (level 3)
1999–2000 Football League Second Division play-off winner (level 3)

Individual
1996–97 PFA Team of the Year Second Division (level 3)

All honours referenced by:

References

External links

1973 births
Living people
Footballers from Westminster
Association football forwards
English footballers
Dulwich Hamlet F.C. players
Brentford F.C. players
Colchester United F.C. players
Reading F.C. players
Gillingham F.C. players
Sheffield United F.C. players
Stoke City F.C. players
Millwall F.C. players
English Football League players